Cheshire League can refer to:

Cheshire County League, a defunct English non-league football competition
Cheshire Football League, an English non-league football competition